State Road 186 (NM 186) is a , paved, two-lane state highway in Doña Ana County in the U.S. state of New Mexico. NM 186's eastern terminus is south of Chamberino at the road's junction with NM 28. The road's western terminus is west of Anthony at the road's junction with Levee Road FL 5872 on the eastern bank of the Rio Grande river. The road continues further east as West Ohara Road until its junction with NM 478. NM 186 is also known as West Ohara Road.

Route description
The highway begins at the junction with NM 28 south of Chamberino. The road heads east-northeast through pecan orchards and fields of Mesilla Valley and after approximately 0.7 miles crosses La Union Main Canal. At  NM 186 passes by Anthony Country Club, then crosses the Rio Grande river over a  bridge, built in 1957. NM 186 reaches its eastern terminus at intersection with FL 5872 (Levee Road) right after crossing the river.

History
The original Route 186 was created in mid-1930s as a connector between Route 180 in San Lorenzo, and Route 185 in Beaverhead (current location of Beaverhead Ranger Station). After 1940 the segment became an extension of Route 61. In 1970, the southern part became part of Route 35. By 1988, the northern part through the mountains became NFS 150.

The section occupied by modern day NM 186 was built in mid 1950s as a connector road between NM 28 and NM 478. In 1970s NM 404 was extended first to NM 478, and then in 1980s all the way to NM 28 over the segment of modern day NM 186.  In 2000s NM 404 was shortened to its original stretch, and the portion between NM 28 and the Rio Grande bridge was designated as NM 186.

Major intersections

See also

References

External links

186
Transportation in Doña Ana County, New Mexico